The following lists events that happened during 1981 in Libya.

Incumbents
 President: Muammar al-Gaddafi
 Prime Minister: Jadallah Azzuz at-Talhi

Events

January
  6 January - a joint communiqué is issued that Libya and Chad had decided "to work to achieve full unity between the two countries". The merger plan caused strong adverse reactions internationally.

May
 May 6 - Citing Libya's support of international terrorism, the United States ordered the closure of the Libyan Embassy in Washington, D.C.  Ambassador Ali Houderi was summoned to the U.S. State Department, and told to withdraw the 27 diplomats and their families within one week. The U.S. Embassy in Libya had closed in 1980. Diplomatic relations were restored in 2004.

August
 19 August - a naval dogfight occurred over the Gulf of Sirte. US F-14 Tomcat jets shot down two Libyan aircraft.

October
 29 October - withdrawal of Libyan forces from Chadian territory, completed by 16 November. The Libyans were to be replaced by an OAU Inter-African Force (IAF).

 Launch of the second Five-Year Economic and Social Transformation Plan (1982-1987)

References

 
Years of the 20th century in Libya
1980s in Libya
Libya
Libya